Israelitische Gemeente Soerabaia (English: Israeli Congregation in Surabaya) is a Jewish association in Surabaya that was founded in 1923. Most of the members of this association are Iraqi Jews and still use Hebrew names. They have one synagogue located on Jl. Not. 4-5 Surabaya. The temple was built on the Eigendom Verponding estate owned by Joseph Ezra Izaak Nassiem in 1948 and was later cared for by the Sayers family.

History 
During the Dutch colonial period, there were hundreds of Jewish immigrants living in Surabaya. Most of them work as government employees, soldiers or merchants. Surabaya was an ideal place to live for immigrant Jews at that time because the Dutch colonial government protected and gave them civil rights without discrimination. It is estimated that the Jewish population in Surabaya reaches 500 people. However, this number continued to decline along with the suppression of Japan supported by Germany under the Nazi Party.

Israelitische Gemeente Soerabaia was founded by Izak Ellias Binome Ehrenoreis Rechte Grunfeld and Emma Mizrahie on July 31, 1923, in Surabaya. The association once established a synagogue on Jalan Bubutan and then moved to a synagogue on Jalan Kayon, Surabaya, in order to accommodate more congregations.

The Jewish community in Surabaya was drastically reduced during the Sinai War, Israel, the United Kingdom and France attacked Egypt to seize the Suez Canal, which caused hatred against the Jews in Indonesia. The existence of Jews in Indonesia was nearing its end when President Sukarno issued a policy of nationalizing foreign assets. At the end of the 1950s, the Jewish community also left Indonesia with a wave of return and expulsion of non-Indonesian citizens abroad.

Despite the abandonment of many adherents, the Surabaya synagogue has at least ten congregations who regularly visit even though they do not have a rabbi. In 2013, there was a demonstration by Islamic organizations in front of the Surabaya Synagogue to protest the Israeli attack on Palestine. They then also sealed and pressured the Surabaya government not to give the synagogue the status of a cultural heritage building. Because for years there was no clarity on the status of the synagogue, the synagogue caretaker tore down the building and sold the land to the private sector.

See also 

 History of the Jews in Indonesia

References 

Jewish organizations
Jews and Judaism in Indonesia
Surabaya
1923 establishments in the Dutch East Indies
Iraqi-Jewish diaspora